The SS Francis Hinton was a wooden-hulled steam barge that sank in a gale off the coast of Manitowoc, Wisconsin, on Lake Michigan in 1909 while heavily laden with a cargo of lumber. On December 16, 1996, the wreck of the Francis Hinton was listed on the National Register of Historic Places.

History
The Francis Hinton (Official number 120754) was built in 1889 by Danish immigrants Jasper Hanson and Hans Scove (collectively known as Hanson & Scove) in Manitowoc for Horatio Truman and George Cooper of Manitowoc. She had a gross register tonnage of 417.34 tons, and a net register tonnage of 331.07 tons. She was powered by a  Steeple compound engine that was built by the Manistee Iron Works of Manistee, Michigan, and a single boiler. She had an Inland Lloyd's rating of A1, and was valued at $35.000 in 1890.

In 1891 the Francis Hinton was sold to the Wisconsin Dredge & Dock Company of Manitowoc. In 1897 the Francis Hinton was sold to James A. Calbick of Chicago, Illinois. In 1899 the Francis Hinton was sold to Ausin A. Canavan of Chicago. In 1902 she was sold to Marine Navigation Company of Marine City, Michigan. On April 18, 1904, the Francis Hinton had her tonnage changed to 397 gross register tons, and 273 net register tons. On August 25, 1905, the Francis Hinton had a collision with the steamer Binghamton near Peche Island in the Detroit River.

Final voyage
On November 16, 1909, the Francis Hinton left Manistique, Michigan, for Chicago, heavily laden with a cargo of lumber. After encountering a gale, her crew discovered that she was taking on water and decided to try and get her to the safety of Two Rivers Harbor. After the water that leaked into her hull extinguished the fire in her boiler, the Francis Hinton was left immobile. Her crew dropped her anchor, but the large waves kept on pounding her hull and letting water in. Eventually, her captain ordered her anchor line cut, and she drifted ashore. The Two Rivers Lifesaving determined that the seas were too rough to attempt to rescue the Francis Hinton crew. Her crew eventually deployed a yawl and made it to shore safely. A day after she wrecked, the Francis Hinton crew, and the lifesaving crew stripped her of everything of value on board.

The Francis Hinton today
The remains of the Francis Hinton were rediscovered by sports divers in 1987. The wreckage consists of her bilge, her boiler, her four-bladed propeller. Also on the site are the remains of her Steeple compound engine. Due to her shallow depth, her wreck has received a lot of damage from ice and waves. The wreck of the Francis Hinton lies near the wreck of the tugboat .

References

Maritime incidents in 1909
Shipwrecks on the National Register of Historic Places in Wisconsin
National Register of Historic Places in Manitowoc County, Wisconsin
Shipwrecks of Lake Michigan
Steamships of the United States
Great Lakes freighters
Merchant ships of the United States
1889 ships
Steam barges
Shipwrecks of the Wisconsin coast
Ships built in Manitowoc, Wisconsin
Wreck diving sites in the United States
Ships sunk in storms